Pascual-Castroviejo syndrome type 1 is a rare autosomal recessive condition characterized by facial dysmorphism, cognitive impairment and skeletal anomalies.

Signs and symptoms

These can be divided into four areas
 Facial features
 Brachycephaly
 Low hairline
 Narrow forehead
 Bushy eyebrows
 Synophrys
 Hypertelorism
 Ptosis
 Broad nose
 Wide philtrum
 Triangular shaped mouth
 Maxillary hypoplasia
 Cleft lip and palate
 Small conical teeth
 Short neck
 Skeletal abnormalities
 Abnormalities of the upper thoracic vertebrae and ribs
 Hypermobility
 Talipes (clubfoot)
 Central nervous system
 Hypoplasia of the corpus callosum and cerebellar vermis
 Cognitive impairment
 Chiari I malformation
 Optic nerve colobomas
 Grey matter hypodensity
 Other
 Hypothyroidism

Genetics

This disease is caused by mutations in the transmembrane and coiled-coil domain-containing protein 1 (TMCO1) on the long arm of chromosome 1.

Diagnosis

The diagnosis may be provisionally made on clinical grounds. Further diagnostic tests include serum and urine analysis for lactic acid, a chest X-ray (or cardiac CT or MRI) and echocardiography. Biopsies from cardiac and skeletal muscle will show the presence of lipid and glycogen. Testing for mitochondrial abnormalities including adenosine nucleotide transporter deficiency and decreases in the respiratory chain complexes I and IV can also be done.

Differential diagnosis

This condition forms part of the spectrum of  TMCO1 defects. There may be some overlap in features.

Treatment

There is no known treatment for this condition. Surgery may be helpful in treating the cleft lip and palate.

Prognosis

All cases to date have been reported in children. Long term prognosis is not known.

Epidemiology

Pascual-Castroviejo syndrome type 1 is rare. About 20 cases have been reported worldwide.

History

This condition was first described in 1975.

References

External links 

Autosomal recessive disorders
Genetic diseases and disorders
Rare syndromes